"...Ready for It?" is a song by American singer-songwriter Taylor Swift from her sixth studio album, Reputation (2017). The song was released for digital download as a promotional single on September 3, and impacted radio stations as the album's second single on September 17; an official remix by BloodPop was released on December 10. Written by Swift and producers Max Martin, Shellback, and Ali Payami, it is an electropop and industrial pop song with elements of dancehall and trap. The track has Swift rapping over heavy synthesizers, bass drops, and programmed drums.

Lyrically, it depicts a narrator finding a new lover using criminal imagery mentioning bank heist and ransom. The accompanying music video, directed by Joseph Kahn, features a dark, futuristic aesthetic and references sci-fi franchises. Upon release, critics praised the anthemic production of "...Ready for It?" but some felt it was generic and similar to other popular songs on contemporary radio. The single peaked within the top ten on charts and received multi-platinum certifications in Australia, Canada, and the United States.

Promotion and release
Swift had first teased a portion of the single, along with "Look What You Made Me Do", on September 2, 2017, during ABC's Saturday Night Football broadcast of the Florida State vs. Alabama game, and was also used in the introduction to every Saturday Night Football game on ABC that season. The same day, she announced it would be included on her upcoming album, Reputation, and confirmed its release as a promotional single. It was made available for digital download as part of the pre-order of the album on September 3, 2017. It impacted contemporary hit radio on September 17, 2017.

A remix for the song featuring American musician BloodPop was released on December 10, 2017. The remix received positive reviews from critics. On December 14, a lyric video for the remix was uploaded to Swift's Vevo channel on YouTube, which included clips from the original music video, released about a month and half before. As of August 2020, the lyric video for the remix has gained over nine million views on YouTube.

Writing and composition

"...Ready for It?" is an electropop and industrial pop song. It incorporates influences of dancehall and trap music. The song features deep synths, a tropical house chorus, a dubstep bass drop, drum machines and rapping. The atmosphere of the song drew comparisons to Kanye West and Rihanna. The song is performed in the key of E minor with a tempo of 80 beats per minute, with Swift's vocals spanning from G3 to D5.

The song lyrically revolves around Swift's fantasies about an individual whom she describes as a "killer" who has had multiple relationships and is "younger than her exes" but "acts like such a man". These fantasies include "holding him for ransom", committing a bank heist together, moving to a secret offshore location and being held in jail. Swift uses images of Hollywood romance, islands and going undercover so that "no one has to know". She also addresses the perception of her own romantic history by comparing herself to Elizabeth Taylor and her lover to Richard Burton.

Critical reception
"...Ready for It?" received positive reviews from music critics, calling it an improvement from Swift's previous single, "Look What You Made Me Do". Tom Breihan of Stereogum said the songwriters "made something ungainly and goofy, something that was probably a terrible idea, and they still made it sound like towering, colossal pop music". Patrick Ryan of USA Today expressed some scepticism concerning Swift's rapping, but noted the contrast between the "anthemic chorus" and "dark", intense verses made for a "promising second glance on her reputation era". Richard He wrote for Billboard that "Swift has never sung more expressively, nor sounded more in tune with the way modern pop production uses the voice as an instrument" and that the song's chorus has "one of the prettiest melodies of her career".

However, Craig Jenkins of Vulture gave it a lukewarm review, stating that the song "doesn't reinvent pop or Taylor, but it does get her name out on a product built to keep pace with current trends". Mike Wass for Idolator dismissed the song as "not good" and called it "equally underwhelming" as "Look What You Made Me Do". He concluded by saying "If you can get past the cringeworthy lyrics and jarring production, a cute chorus awaits. But that's a lot of work for a minor payoff".

Commercial performance
In the United States, "...Ready for It?" debuted and peaked at number four on the Billboard Hot 100, becoming Swift's 22nd top 10 song and her fourteenth top 10 debut on the chart, the most among female artists and second most overall behind rapper Drake. It also became her thirteenth number one song on the Billboard Digital Song Sales chart with opening sales of 135,000 copies, entered the Billboard Streaming Songs chart with 19 million streams in its first week of availability, and opened at 35 on the Billboard Pop Songs chart with a radio audience of 13 million. On other Billboard charts, "...Ready For It?" peaked at number 12 on the Mainstream Top 40 chart, number 10 on the Billboard Adult Top 40 chart, and number 26 on the Adult Contemporary chart.

In Canada, the song peaked at number seven. It opened atop the digital sales chart, dethroning another single from Reputation, "Look What You Made Me Do". Likewise in the UK, it also peaked at number seven, while in Scotland and New Zealand, it peaked at numbers three and number nine, respectively.

In Australia, "...Ready for It?" entered at its peak position of number three on the ARIA Singles Chart, becoming her twelfth top five entry in the nation.

Music video

Production and release

The video was shot on August 21, 2017. An audio for the song was released on September 3, 2017, that has more than 300 million views to date. On October 23, 2017, Swift released a teaser of the music video for the song. The teaser was met with controversy, with many online commentators and media outlets claiming that Swift is physically naked in the music video; many social media users criticized Swift's alleged nudity in the teaser. Subsequently, Swift posted an Instagram story denouncing the nudity claims alongside a selfie of her wearing a bodysuit, captioned "It truly warms my heart that ppl had so much to say about this bodysuit."

The full video premiered on October 26. It was directed by Joseph Kahn. The video features homage references to sci-fi and anime, such as Blade Runner, Tron and Ghost in the Shell. As of October 2021, the video has over 300 million views on YouTube.

Synopsis
The video features two versions of Swift. One version is a cyborg in a white bodysuit. She is shown behind the walls of a cell being guarded by several men in suits. The other version of Swift is seen wearing a large black cloak. The video starts with the cloaked Swift walking through an alley, making her way past several guards and typing in a code to access the room where the cyborg Swift is being held. Graffiti seen on the walls are lyrics from the Reputation. The cloaked Swift walks up to the cell walls and watches as the cyborg Swift transforms into several iterations - she wears futuristic armor, rides a white horse, manipulates various flickers of energy, and shoots lightning bolts from her fingertips. Eventually, the cyborg Swift is able to break through the cell walls, with shards of glass cutting the cloaked Swift across the face, revealing she is a cyborg as well. The cyborg guards try to contain both of them to no avail, and the video ends as cyborg Swift moves up an escalator.

Live performances
Swift performed "...Ready for It?" for the first time during an episode of the 43rd season of Saturday Night Live on November 11, 2017, alongside an acoustic version of "Call It What You Want". Swift also performed "...Ready for It?" as part of the KIIS-FM's Jingle Ball 2017 on December 1, 2017, in Inglewood, California. Two days later, Swift returned onstage to perform the song again as part of 99.7 Now!'s Poptopia in San Jose, California with the same setlist. The following week, Swift performed the song again on three other occasions, such as the B96 Chicago and Pepsi Jingle Bash 2017 in Chicago, the Z100 Jingle Ball 2017 in New York City and Jingle Bell Ball 2017 in London.

The song was the opening number of Swift's Reputation Stadium Tour and included on the set list of the Eras Tour (2023).

On May 27, 2018, Swift opened her set as part of BBC Radio 1's Biggest Weekend in Singleton Park in Swansea, Wales with the song.

Accolades

Usage in media
ESPN used it in its college football telecast advertisements for the season opening game between Alabama and Florida State, which was aired on ABC on September 2.
On the March 16, 2018, episode of the reality television singing competition show The Voice, Team Kelly (Clarkson) members Brynn Cartelli and Dylan Hartigan performed a grunge-rock arrangement of the song in a Battle round. While coaches Adam Levine and Alicia Keys preferred Cartelli's vocal performance, coach Blake Shelton preferred Hartigan's. Ultimately, Clarkson chose to agree with Levine and Keys and named Cartelli the winner of the Battle, advancing her to the Knockout rounds.  Soon after, Hartigan was stolen onto Team Blake, saving him from elimination.
The song was featured in the animated jukebox musical film Sing 2 (2021).

Credits and personnel
Credits are adapted from the liner notes of Reputation.

Studio

 Recorded at MXM Studios (Stockholm, Sweden)
 Mixed at Mixstar Studios (Virginia Beach, Virginia)
 Mastered at Sterling Sound Studios (New York)

Personnel

 Taylor Swift – lead vocals, background vocals, songwriter
 Max Martin – producer, songwriter, recording, keyboards, programming
 Shellback – producer, songwriter, recording, keyboards, programming
 Ali Payami – producer, songwriter, keyboards, programming

 Şerban Ghenea – mixing
 John Hanes – mix engineer
 Randy Merrill – mastering

Charts

Weekly charts

Year-end charts

Certifications

Release history

Notes

See also

 List of number-one digital songs of 2017 (Canada)
 List of number-one digital songs of 2017 (U.S.)
 List of Billboard Hot 100 top 10 singles in 2017
 List of UK top 10 singles in 2017
 List of top 10 singles in 2017 (Australia)

References

2017 songs
Big Machine Records singles
Electropop songs
Song recordings produced by Max Martin
Song recordings produced by Shellback (record producer)
Songs written by Ali Payami
Songs written by Max Martin
Songs written by Shellback (record producer)
Songs written by Taylor Swift
Taylor Swift songs
2017 singles
Music video controversies
Music videos directed by Joseph Kahn
Song recordings produced by Ali Payami
Industrial songs